The 2016 Judo World Masters was held in Guadalajara, Mexico, from 27 to 29 May 2016.

Medal summary

Medal table

Men's events

Women's events

References

External links
 

World Masters
IJF World Masters
World Masters
World Masters